Nanhu station is a station on Loop line of Chongqing Rail Transit in Chongqing municipality, China. It is located in Nan'an District and opened in 2018. Line 10 will also reach this station once Phase II is finished.

References

Railway stations in Chongqing
Railway stations in China opened in 2018
Chongqing Rail Transit stations